Redmond "Red" Gerard (born June 29,  2000) is an American snowboarder and a spokesperson of the Toyota Motor Corporation. Gerard was born and raised in Ohio, but lives in Silverthorne, Colorado, where he has his own miniature snowboarding park in his backyard with a rope tow.

Gerard competed in the slopestyle and big air events for the United States at the 2018 Winter Olympics. In slopestyle, Gerard won the gold medal for his performance. This performance itself was rather famous for the events surrounding Gerard; he had overslept in his hotel room after partying late and binge-watching Brooklyn Nine-Nine on Netflix, lost his jacket, was forced to borrow his roommate's jacket, and accidentally used profanity on live TV after his win. He became the first Winter Olympics medalist born in the 2000s. Gerard was also the first American gold medalist in the 2018 Winter Olympics and the youngest American to medal in a snowboarding event at the Olympics. The 2018 Pyeongchang Olympic winter games was his first time competing in the Olympics. The February 6, 2018, issue of Sports Illustrated predicted Gerard would win the gold medal.

In 2017, he placed 1st overall in Slopestyle in the FIS Snowboard World Cup Standings. In 2019, Gerard won the overall Toyota Grand Prix in Mammoth, California. He also won the Burton US Open in men’s slopestyle. He placed 1st in the 2018 Aspen Toyota Grand Prix, 2nd in the 2018 Mammoth Toyota Grand Prix, and 1st in the 2017 Mammoth Toyota Grand Prix. He placed 4th in the 2017 Winter Dew Tour, 4th in the 2017 Burton US Open, and 4th in Slopestyle at the 2015 FIS Junior World Championships.

Gerard's sister is food blogger  Tieghan Gerard from Half Baked Harvest.

References

External links
 
 
 
 
 
 
 

2000 births
Living people
American male snowboarders
Snowboarders at the 2018 Winter Olympics
Snowboarders at the 2022 Winter Olympics
Olympic gold medalists for the United States in snowboarding
Medalists at the 2018 Winter Olympics
People from Westlake, Ohio
People from Summit County, Colorado
Sportspeople from Ohio
Sportspeople from Colorado
21st-century American people